Tabernaemontana citrifolia is a species of plant in the family Apocynaceae. It is found in the West Indies.

References

citrifolia